Boutry is a French surname. Notable people with the surname include:

Edgar-Henri Boutry (1857–1938), French sculptor
Innocent Boutry, French chapel master
Roger Boutry (born 1932), French composer and conductor

See also
Boudry

French-language surnames